Açaí na tigela ("açaí in the bowl") is a Brazilian dessert from Pará and Amazonas, where the Ribeirinhos people prepare it regularly. It is a dish made with the frozen and mashed fruit of the açaí palm, which has berries described as having an "earthy" or creamy taste. Its texture is granular before blending and it has a tartness from a high acidity content, making its taste appealing. It is served as a smoothie in a bowl or glass, and is commonly topped with granola and banana, and then mixed with other fruits and guaraná syrup.

Regions and preparation
Although açaí na tigela is commonly consumed all over Brazil it has become more regionalized mainly in Pará, Rio de Janeiro, Florianópolis, São Paulo, Goiás and along the northeastern coast, where it is sold in kiosks lining the beach promenade and in juice bars throughout the cities. 

It is common to see açaí served with fish and cassava. The sweet variety, which contains granola, banana, blueberry, strawberry, goji berry, and other fruits, as well as sugar, is more common in southern parts of the country.

See also 
 List of Brazilian dishes
 List of Brazilian sweets and desserts

References 

Brazilian desserts
Frozen desserts
Fruit dishes
Açaí